Endean is a surname. Notable people with the surname include:

 Barry Endean (born 1946), English footballer
 Bill Endean (1884–1957), New Zealand politician
 Craig Endean (born 1968), Canadian hockey player
 Robert Endean (1925–1997), Australian marine scientist and academic
 Russell Endean (1924–2003), South African cricketer